Teremas "Terem" Igobor Moffi (born 25 May 1999) is a Nigerian professional footballer who plays as a forward for Ligue 1 club Nice, on loan from Lorient, and the Nigeria national team.

Club career

Moffi left Nigeria and moved to England to join the Buckswood Football Academy at Hastings, East Sussex at the age of 17, and thereafter moved to Lithuania with Kauno Žalgiris. He eventually joined Riteriai, but had visa issues that delayed his debut. Moffi eventually scored 20 goals in 29 leagues games for Riteriai, and transferred to Belgian club Kortrijk in January 2020.

On 1 October 2020, Moffi joined Ligue 1 side Lorient on a permanent deal.

On 31 January 2023, he signed for Nice on loan until the end of the season, with an obligation-to-buy for €30 million and a 15% sell-on clause in favor of Lorient.

International career 
On 14 May 2021, Nigeria head coach Gernot Rohr included Moffi in his 31-man list for friendlies in June. Moffi debuted with the Super Eagles in a 1–0 loss to Cameroon on 4 June 2021.

Personal life
Moffi's father, Leo, was a professional footballer in Nigeria and played as a goalkeeper.

Career statistics

Club

References

External links
 

Living people
1999 births
People from Calabar
Nigerian footballers
Nigeria international footballers
Association football forwards
FK Kauno Žalgiris players
FK Riteriai players
K.V. Kortrijk players
FC Lorient players
OGC Nice players
A Lyga players
Belgian Pro League players
Ligue 1 players
Nigerian expatriate footballers
Nigerian expatriate sportspeople in Lithuania
Expatriate footballers in Lithuania
Nigerian expatriate sportspeople in Belgium
Expatriate footballers in Belgium
Nigerian expatriate sportspeople in France
Expatriate footballers in France